Broken Dolls are a British band from Coventry.

They signed a five-album deal with Southern Fried Records in 2004, and toured extensively playing such events and shows as Get Loaded in the Park, Glastonbury, Hyde Park (O2 festival), Radio One Big weekend/ Live Lounge, NME awards, Radio 1, Radio 2 and 6Music.

The band was also featured on the E! True Hollywood Story of Kate Moss, and featured their song, "Here We Go," in reference of Moss' drug problem.

Their first album was produced by Jim Abbiss (Arctic Monkeys, Kasabian, Editors) Jagz Kooner (Primal Scream, Infadels) and Dave Bascombe (Goldfrapp)

"Here We Go," was also featured on the Test Drive Unlimited soundtrack.

Their album Broken Dolls was released on 23 July 2007, to rapturous reviews and excellent support from top national radio DJs.

They have starred in a video for their "Here We Go" song, which was published on YouTube in November 2007.

References

Musical groups from Coventry